Cnephasia heringi is a species of moth of the family Tortricidae. It is found in Bulgaria, Greece, North Macedonia, Russia and Turkey.

The length of the forewings is 6.6–8.3 mm for males and 8–9.2 mm for females. Adults have been recorded on wing in May.

References

Moths described in 1958
heringi
Moths of Asia
Moths of Europe
Taxa named by Józef Razowski